SS Le Calvados was a French cargo ship used as a troopship in World War I.

Le Calvados was built in 1890 at the Cockerill Yards in Hoboken, Antwerp, Belgium, for the French Compagnie Générale Transatlantique.

After the outbreak of World War I, the French Army requisitioned her for use in transporting troops. Of the 800 people on board, 740 were killed. 
55 survivors were rescued by the British SS Lady Plymouth, only 24h after the sinking.

References

Links  
 Account by one of the survivors, Capitain Georges Barré
 Wrecksite

Ships built in Belgium
1890 ships
Steamships of France
Troop ships of France
Maritime incidents in 1915
Ships sunk by German submarines in World War I
World War I shipwrecks in the Mediterranean Sea